J'ai perdu Albert is a French comedy directed and written by Didier Van Cauwelaert. It is the final film composed by Michel Legrand before his death in 2019.

Plot
Chloe, a young medium that the great business leaders, politicians and the jet set snapped up, shelters in her since childhood the spirit of Albert Einstein. Overworked, the information does not "pass" anymore. So Albert decides to move ... For better or for worse, he settles in Zac, a depressive Cartesian, beekeeper routed and waiter. Become inseparable and complementary, because one has the "genius" and the other his instructions, Zac and Chloe, these two beings who oppose everything, will live in 48 hours the most hallucinating "households for three" ...

Cast
 Stéphane Plaza : Zac
 Julie Ferrier : Chloé
 Josiane Balasko : Madame Le Couidec
 Bernard Le Coq : Georges
 Virginie Visconti : Nelly
 Etienne Draber : Albert Einstein
 Philippe du Janerand : Roland Buech
 Jean-Noël Cnokaert : Olivier
 Alex Vizorek : Damien
 Patrick Préjean : The priest
 Denis Mpunga : Général Beck
 Daniel Benoin : Surgeon Moulin
 Michael Cambier : Guillaume

Production
Principal photography on the film October 2017 in Nice.

References

External links

2018 films
2018 comedy films
French comedy films
2010s French-language films
2010s French films